Beinan Township or Peinan Township is a rural township in Taitung County, Taiwan. It has a population of 16,798 as of February 2023. It is home to the Puyuma and Rukai peoples.

Name
This southeastern region of Taiwan was originally dominated by the Puyuma people. The township is named in Puyuma in honor of chief Pinara.

In Dutch Formosa, the Dutch called the township Pimala. During Qing rule, access to the area was prohibited.

History
In 1875, Pi-lam Subprefecture (卑南廳) was established. During the period of Japanese rule,  was established under Taitō District, Taitō Prefecture. After the handover of Taiwan from Japan to the Republic of China in 1945, Beinan was established as a rural township of Taitung County.

Geography

The northeast portion of the township is part of the Huatung Valley.

Administrative divisions
The township comprises 13 villages: Binlang, Chulu, Fushan, Fuyuan, Jiafong, Liji, Lijia, Meinong, Mingfong, Taian, Taiping, Tunghsing and Wenkuan.

Tourist attractions
 Baiyu Waterfall
 Chu Lu Ranch
 Jhihben National Forest Recreation Area
 Cingjue Temple
 Taromak Monument
 Yuan Sen Applied Botanical Garden
 Jhihben Hot Spring

Transportation

Beinan Township is accessible from Shanli Station of the Taiwan Railways.

Notable natives
 A-mei, singer and songwriter
 Lin Shu-ling, activist

References

External links

 Beinan Township Office, Taitung County

Townships in Taitung County
Taiwan placenames originating from Formosan languages